Confederate imprints are books, pamphlets, broadsides, newspapers, periodicals or sheet music printed in the Confederate States of America in a location which, at the time, was under Confederate and not Union control.   Confederate imprints are important as sources of the history of the Civil War and many institutional libraries have formed large collections of these works.  A number of checklists and bibliographies of them have been published, one of which catalogs 9,457 imprints.

Printing in the South
Prior to Secession, the South manufactured relatively few books, but imported them heavily from Northern cities such as New York, Boston, and Philadelphia.  In 1860, there were only four major book publishers in the South, although there were numerous small job printers.  Of even greater concern was the fact that the South manufactured little of its own paper and ink.  After Secession, these were no longer available from the North, and the South began to expand its own printing and manufacture of paper and ink.  Shortages of these supplies, however, were chronic and often severe.

Important collections
The following institutions have significant collections of Confederate imprints:
 Boston Athenaeum   
 Library of Congress   
 Rice University's Fondren Library's Woodson Research Center 
 Rosanna Blake Library of Confederate History at Marshall University 
 Virginia Historical Society
 Duke University's Rubenstein Rare Book & Manuscript Library  
 American Civil War Museum's Museum of the Confederacy Collection  
 South Carolina Historical Society 
 The Hargrett Rare Book and Manuscript Library at University of Georgia 
The Rare Book & Manuscript Library (University of Illinois at Urbana-Champaign)
 The Division of Special Collections at The University of Alabama

Bibliographies of Confederate imprints

 Crandall, Marjorie Lyle. Confederate Imprints: A Checklist Based Principally on the Collection of the Boston Athenaeum. Boston: The Boston Atheneaum, 1955.digitized version
  Harwell, Richard. Confederate belles-lettres, a bibliography and a finding list of the fiction, poetry, drama, songsters, and miscellaneous literature published in the Confederate States of America. Hattiesburg, Miss.: The Book Farm, 1941.
  Harwell, Richard. Cornerstones of Confederate Collecting. Charlottesville: University of Virginia Press for the Bibliographical Society of the University of Virginia, 1953.
  Harwell, Richard. More Confederate Imprints. Richmond: Virginia State Library, 1957.
  Harwell, Richard. In Tall Cotton: The 200 Most Important Confederate Books. Austin: Jenkins Pub. Co., 1978.
  Harwell, Richard. Confederate Imprints. Wendell, N.C.: Broadfoot's Bookmark, 1982.
  Parrish, T. Michael and Robert M. Willingham, Jr. Confederate Imprints: A Bibliography of Southern Publications from Secession to Surrender. Austin, TX : Jenkins Publishing Co. & Katonah, NY: Gary A Foster, n.d.
  Rudolph, E. L. Confederate Broadside Verse: A Bibliography and Finding List of Confederate broadside ballads and songs. New Braunfels, Texas: Book Farm, 1950.

See also

Confederate paper currency
Confederate postage stamps

References

External links
Examples of Confederate publishers bindings

Economic history of the Confederate States of America
American Civil War books
Printing in the United States
Book publishing in the United States